Mälardalen University (Swedish: Mälardalens universitet), or MDU, is a Swedish university college located in Västerås and Eskilstuna, Sweden. It has 16,000 students and around 1000 employees, of which 91 are professors, 504 teachers, and 215 doctoral students. Mälardalen University is the world's first environmentally certified school according to the international standard ISO 14001.

In December 2020, the Löfven government proposed that the university should receive university status from 1 January 2022.

Research 
The University has six different research specialisations: educational sciences and mathematics, embedded systems, future energy, health and welfare, industrial economics and management, and innovation and product realisation.

Education 
The University has education in economics, health and welfare, teacher education, and engineering, as well as art education in classical music and opera. Education at the research level is given within a dozen subjects.

Organization 
Mälardalen University is organized into four schools:
 School of Health, Care and Social Welfare
 School of Education, Culture, and Communication
 School of Sustainable Development of Society and Technology
 School of Innovation, Design, and Engineering

See also
List of universities in Sweden

References

External links
Official website

Educational institutions established in 1977
Mälardalen University College
Buildings and structures in Västerås
Buildings and structures in Södermanland County
Education in Västerås
1977 establishments in Sweden